Australia national football team may refer to:
 Australia men's national soccer team (The Socceroos)
 Australia women's national soccer team (The Matildas)
 Australia national American football team (The Outbacks)
 Australia men's international rules football team
 Australia women's international rules football team
 Australia men's national rugby league team (The Kangaroos)
 Australia women's national rugby league team (The Jillaroos)
 Australia men's national rugby union team (The Wallabies)
 Australia women's national rugby union team (The Wallaroos)
 All-Australian team, an honorary all-star team in men's Australian rules football

See also
 Football in Australia
 Wikipedia:Naming conventions (Football in Australia)